Swellengrebel is a Dutch surname. Notable people with the surname include:

 Hendrik Swellengrebel (1700–1760), Dutch colonial governor
 Nicolaas Swellengrebel (1885–1970), Dutch epidemiologist, parasitologist, and pathologist

Dutch-language surnames